George Morgan Thomas (November 23, 1828 – January 7, 1914) was a U.S. Representative from Lewis County, Kentucky.

Born near Poplar Flat, Kentucky, in Lewis County, Thomas was educated in the common schools. He taught school two years. He was school commissioner from 1850 to 1859. He studied law, was admitted to the bar in 1851, and practiced.

Thomas was elected prosecuting attorney of Lewis County in 1854 and served for four years. He was a member of the Kentucky House of Representatives from 1859 to 1863. He served as Commonwealth's attorney for the tenth judicial district 1862-1868. He was elected county judge in 1868 and was an unsuccessful Republican candidate for Lieutenant Governor of Kentucky in 1871, losing the election to Democrat John G. Carlisle. He was again a member of the State house of representatives in 1872 and 1873. He was the circuit judge of the fourteenth judicial district from 1874 to 1880 and United States district attorney from 1881 to 1885.

Thomas was elected as a Republican to the Fiftieth Congress (March 4, 1887 – March 3, 1889). He was appointed Solicitor of Internal Revenue by President William McKinley on May 20, 1897, and served until May 31, 1901.

He died in Vanceburg, Kentucky, January 7, 1914. He was interred in Woodland Cemetery on a hill overlooking the city.

References

1828 births
1914 deaths
Kentucky Commonwealth's Attorneys
Kentucky lawyers
Kentucky state court judges
Kentucky Unionists
Kentucky Whigs
Members of the Kentucky House of Representatives
People from Lewis County, Kentucky
United States Attorneys for the District of Kentucky
Republican Party members of the United States House of Representatives from Kentucky
19th-century American politicians
19th-century American judges
19th-century American lawyers